The 2015 Pan American Men's Club Handball Championship took place in Taubaté 20-24 may. It acts as the Pan American qualifying tournament for the 2015 IHF Super Globe.

Teams
 River Plate
 SAG Villa Ballester
 Handebol Taubaté
 EC Pinheiros
 Luterano de Valparaíso

Results

Final standing

References

External links
PATHF Official tournament website

Pan American Men's Club Handball Championship
2015 in handball
Club
Taubaté
2015 in Brazilian sport